USS Corwin was a steamer acquired by the Union Navy during the American Civil War. She was used by the Union Navy to patrol navigable waterways of the Confederacy to prevent the South from trading with other countries.

Service history
Corwin was a side wheel gunboat, wooden steamer built at Philadelphia, Pennsylvania, in 1849 for the U.S. Coast Survey, transferred to the U.S. Revenue Service in April 1861. Transferred to the Navy Department for special service in September 1861, under command of Lieutenant Thomas S. Phelps. The  vessel was armed with two medium 32-pounders and two 12-pounder guns. She surveyed the coast of North Carolina. For example, On 14 November 1861, the Corwin, a side-wheel gunboat, wooden steamer revenue cutter, repulsed the gunboat  in Hatteras Inlet, an estuary in North Carolina. 

On 1 April 1862, she joined the North Atlantic Blockading Squadron for duty in Hampton Roads and adjacent waters. On 13 July, she was detached and ordered to the Potomac River for survey work. Corwin repulsed another attack by Curlew in Hatteras Inlet on 14 November; and rendered effective assistance to the steamer Quinnebaug aground off Beaufort, North Carolina on 22 July 1865. She was returned to the U.S. Coast Survey, Treasury Department, after the war.

References

External links
Coast guard page on Corwin
A RECONNOISSANCE UP THE MATTAPONY; VOYAGE OF THE COAST-SURVEY SCHOONER CORWIN --UNION REFUGEES FROM NORTH CAROLINA. New York Times 17 May 1862

Ships of the Union Navy
Ships built in Philadelphia
Steamships of the United States Navy
Gunboats of the United States Navy
1849 ships